George M. Thomas (born 22 November 1954) is an Indian politician, a member of the Communist Party of India (Marxist). He is former Member of the Legislative Assembly (MLA) of Kerala from Thiruvambady.

Personal life
George M. Thomas was born on 22 November 1954 at Kelothu Vayal in Kayanna Panchayath in a middle-class family. His father is Thomas and mother is Annamma. He has three brothers and five sisters. He completed high school education from St. George's High School, Kulathuvayal and joined St. Philomina's College in Mysore for higher studies, but was not able to complete the degree course due to personal reasons. He married Anice, daughter of Varkey and Anna on 10 January 1976. His son Anoop was born on 25 September 1977 and his daughter Manjusha was born on 23 December 1982. Both are employed and married and each has one son. He is a staunch atheist.

As a party worker
He joined Kisan sabha and KSYF in 1977 and served as its vice-president Kodiyathur Panchayath. Later he became an active worker of CPI(M) in 1980 and held the post of branch secretary, local secretary, and area secretary before entering electoral politics.

Electoral Politics
George M. Thomas represented Thiruvambady in Kerala Niyamasabha in 2006 by-election after Mathai Chacko's death and was also candidate in 2011 assembly election. In 2016 assembly election he repeated his victory that happened in 2006.

Current status
He is the current MLA of Thiruvambady Assembly Constituency and working as a CPI(M) DC member, AIKS state committee member, and as district joint secretary. Presently he resides in Thottumukkam, Kozhikode district.

References

1955 births
Living people
Malayali politicians
Communist Party of India (Marxist) politicians from Kerala
Kerala MLAs 2016–2021
Kerala MLAs 2006–2011